Haa, Ha, or Has is a Thromde or town, and the seat of Haa District in Bhutan.

Haa is situated in Haa Valley in the west of the Bhutan bordering Sikkim with ethnic Tibetan and Han majority. The major economic activity is rice production, yak herding and trade with neighbouring China. Haa accommodates The Indian Military Training Team (Also known as IMTRAT). IMTRAT is responsible for the training of the personnel of the Royal Bhutan Army (RBA) and the Royal Bodyguard of Bhutan (RBG). It is the oldest training team sent outside India to a friendly-foreign nation. The place has a religious significance as Lhakhang Karpo and other monasteries are situated there.

See also

 Geography of Bhutan
 Transport in Bhutan

References

Further reading

 Tshewang, Lam Pema (2001)History of the Has (Ha) Valley in Journal of Bhutan Studies Volume 5, Winter 2001  p. 50-56. Thimphu: Centre for Bhutan Studies.

Populated places in Bhutan
Haa District